The United Hatters of North America (UHU) was a labor union representing hat makers, headquartered in the United States. The UHU was founded and received a charter in the American Federation of Labor in 1896 through a merger of the International Trade Association of Hat Finishers of America and the National Hat Makers' Association of the United States. One of its co-founders was John A. Moffitt, who served consecutively as UHU vice president, president, and editor of its official journal from 1896 to 1911.

In 1934, the UHU merged with the Cloth Hat, Cap and Millinery Workers International Union to form the United Hatters, Cap and Millinery Workers International Union (UHCMW), a founding member of the Committee for Industrial Organizations. Subsequent mergers led to the formation of the Amalgamated Clothing and Textile Workers Union (ACTWU) in 1983, and the Union of Needletrades, Industrial and Textile Employees (UNITE) in 1995.

The UHU was the de facto defendant in the landmark 1908 United States Supreme Court Loewe v. Lawlor decision, which was found adversely for the UHU and, by extension, for all unions in the United States. Loewe v. Lawlor outlawed secondary boycotts and ruled that individual union members could be held personally liable for damages incurred by their union.

Leadership

Presidents
1896: Frederick W. Schmalz
1898: John A. Moffit
1911: Simon Blake
1914: John W. Sculley
1918: Michael F. Greene

Secretary-Treasurers
1896: John Phillips
1904: Martin Lawlor

References

Defunct trade unions in the United States
1896 establishments in the United States
1934 disestablishments in the United States
UNITE HERE
Trade unions established in 1896
Trade unions disestablished in 1934
Hat makers' trade unions